Hamid Manssour (born 29 April 1992) is a Syrian male discus thrower, who won an individual gold medal at the Youth World Championships.

References

External links

1992 births
Living people
Syrian male discus throwers